Namyang Dairy Products is a food and dairy corporation headquartered in Seoul, Korea. It is one of South Korea's largest dairy manufacturers, along with Seoul Milk and Maeil Holdings.

See also
Seoul Milk
Maeil Holdings
Economy of South Korea

References

External links
Official website (in Korean)

Manufacturing companies based in Seoul
Food and drink companies of South Korea
Dairy products companies of South Korea
South Korean brands
Food and drink companies established in 1964
South Korean companies established in 1964
Dairy products companies